1920 in Argentine football saw Boca Juniors retain the "Asociación Argentina de Football" (AFA) league title. In the dissident "Asociación Amateurs de Football" (AAm) River Plate ended the run of seven consecutive league titles for Racing Club de Avellaneda.

In international football Argentina finished as runners up in Copa América 1920.

Primera División

Asociación Argentina de Football - Copa Campeonato
Club Eureka disappeared when merging with Sportivo Palermo while the Association expanded the number of to 13 clubs participating. Banfield returned to Primera after promoting the last year while Sportivo Barracas came from rival league "Asociación Amateurs de Football". The rest of the teams were promoted to Primera through a resolution by the association, they were Del Plata, Sportivo del Norte (then Colegiales), Nueva Chicago, Lanús, and Sportivo Palermo.

Asociación Amateur de Football - Primera División
The tournament started with 17 teams then expanded to 19 when Lanús and Sportivo Almagro (that had previously left the Asociación Argentina) joined the league. Ferro Carril Oeste returned to the league after being relegated 2 years before. Barracas Central debuted in Primera after winning the Primera B (Aam) title last year. Sportivo Buenos Aires also debuted in the top division.

River Plate won its first championship ending with Racing Club run of 7 consecutive titles.

Lower divisions

Primera B
AFA Champion: El Porvenir
AAm Champion: General Mitre

Primera C
AFA Champion: Sportivo Avellaneda
AAm Champion: Oriente del Sud

Domestic cups

Copa de Honor MCBA
Champion: Banfield

Copa Ibarguren
 Champion: Tiro Federal

Copa de Competencia (AAm)
 Champion: Rosario Central

International cups

Copa de Honor Cousenier
Champion:  Boca Juniors

Copa Aldao
Champion:  Nacional

Argentina national team

Copa América
In 1920 the Argentina national team travelled to Chile to participate in the 4th edition of Copa América. They finished as runners-up to Uruguay for the third time.

Titles
Copa Premier Honor Argentino 1920

Results

References

 
Seasons in Argentine football